Drzewce-Kolonia  is a village in the administrative district of Gmina Torzym, within Sulęcin County, Lubusz Voivodeship, in western Poland.

The village has a population of 170.

References

Drzewce-Kolonia